Rajendra Desai is former Mayor of Surat, India and a senior Bhartiya Janata Party politician. He served as the city Mayor from 2010 to 2013.Then he was the municipal councillor from Athwa-Nanpura ward.

See also
 Surat Municipal Corporation
 Bharatiya Janata Party

References

Living people
People from Surat
Politicians from Surat
Mayors of Surat
Bharatiya Janata Party politicians from Gujarat
Year of birth missing (living people)